Pitstone & Ivinghoe Football Club are a football club based in Pitstone, near Leighton Buzzard, England. The club is affiliated to the Berks & Bucks Football Association.

History

The club was formed in 1957 after the demise of Ivinghoe & Pitstone F.C. due to financial difficulties and started playing at Pitstone Recreation Ground. The club started in the West Herts League and in their inaugural season won the West Herts Challenge Cup. In the early 1960s, the club then joined the Aylesbury & District League, before returning to the West Herts League in 1966.

The club moved leagues again in 1970 to join the Dunstable Alliance League, not before enjoying some previous cup success with winning the Marsworth Cup twice and both the Apsley Junior and Senior Cups. In the 1976–77 Campaign the club achieved a treble of Trophy's by winning the Premier Division, Premier Division Cup and the Reading Junior Cup. The next season with improved facilities at the Recreation Ground the club was accepted into the South Midlands League and in doing so gained Intermediate status with the Berks & Bucks F.A.

The club then spent the next Eleven season in Division One, earning promotion to the Premier Division under the guidance of manager Ian Magill in the 1987–88 season. The club also lifted the Division One Cup and South Midlands League Challenge Trophy. Two seasons later in the 1989–90 season saw the club gain more Silverware by winning the Premier Division. They then spent three more seasons in the top flight before having to step down to the newly formed Senior Division as their ground did not have floodlights. The club finished bottom of the Senior Division twice and were then relegated to Division One at the end of the 1994–95 season.

At the start of the 1997/98 season with the merger of the South Midlands League and Spartan League, the club became founder members of Spartan South Midlands League Division 1 North. That season also saw the return of manager Ian Magill who guided them to promotion again to the Senior Division(which was then subsequently renamed Division One), in the 2000–01 season, as Champions. In addition for that season the club enjoyed its first County Cup success by beating Hellenic Football League side Finchampstead 2–0 in the Berks & Bucks Intermediate Cup Final.

Ian Magill then stood down in the 2002–03 season and was replaced by Sean Downey. It proved a successful change as the club won Division One title by a ten-point margin, and scoring over a hundred goals in the process. However the club was not able to gain promotion as the club's facilities did not fulfill the league's requirements. Two seasons later, the club was then relegated to Division Two as a result of its ground not meeting the necessary requirements again.

The club has since the 2004–05 season remained in Division Two of the Spartan South Midlands League.
On Saturday 23 February 2013 the First team reached the Final of the Berks & Bucks Intermediate Cup by defeating Letcombe FC 2–1. Previous rounds had seen Pitstone win against Loughton Manor, Aylesbury Dynamoes, Olney Town, Burnham Reserves, and Frilsham and Yattendon. The Final was held at Chesham Utd FC on the evening of 16 April 2013. Pitstone and Ivinghoe FC won the game 2–1 against Aston Clinton FC.
As of the 2019-20 Season, Pitstone & Ivinghoe FC sat in second place of Spartan South Midlands Division Two before the season was suspended in March. A new phase of work for the existing Pavilion Facilities was completed in November 2020 doubling the size of the current building whilst incorporating new Changing facilities, Physiotherapy Room, Turnstile, Footpath work, and Function Area.

Ground
Pitstone & Ivinghoe United play their games at Pitstone Sports Pavilion, Marsworth Road, Pitstone.

Honours

League honours
Spartan South Midlands LeagueDivision One:
 Champions – 2000–01, 2002–03
South Midlands League Premier Division: 
Champions: 1989–90
South Midlands LeagueDivision One:
Champions: 1987–88
Dunstable Alliance Premier Division:
Champions: 1973–74, 1975–76, 1976–77
Runners-up: 1970–71, 1974–75 
West Herts Premier Division:
Champions: 1968–69 
West Herts Division One:
Champions: 1966–67

Cup honours
 
Berks & Bucks Intermediate Cup:
Winners: 2000–01 & 2012-13
South Midlands League Challenge Trophy:
Winners: 1988–89
South Midlands League Premier Division Cup:
Runners-up:  1989–90
South Midlands League Division One Cup:
Winners: 1987–88
Dunstable Alliance Premier Division Cup:
Winners: 1974–75, 1976–77
West Herts Challenge Cup:
Winners: 1957–58  
Reading junior Cup:
Winners: 1976–77 
Runners-up: 1975–76
Apsley Senior Cup:
Winners: 1968–69 
Apsley Junior Cup:
Winners: 1966–67
Marsworth Cup:
Winners: 1966–67, 1967–68
Leighton Challenge Cup:
Runners-up:  1971–72, 2000–01
Watford Peace Memorial Shield:
Runners-up: 1968–69

Records

Highest League Position: 1st in South Midlands League Premier Division 1989–90

References

External links
https://pitstoneandivinghoefc.co.uk

Spartan South Midlands Football League
Football clubs in Buckinghamshire
Association football clubs established in 1957
1957 establishments in England
Football clubs in England
Pitstone
Ivinghoe